Gerald Duane Willard (born March 14, 1960) is an American former professional baseball catcher. He played in Major League Baseball (MLB) from 1984 to 1994 for the Cleveland Indians, Oakland Athletics, Chicago White Sox, Atlanta Braves, Montreal Expos, and Seattle Mariners. He currently works as a Campus Supervisor for the Oxnard Union High School District and coaches baseball at Adolfo Camarillo High School.

Career
A 1978 graduate of Hueneme High School in Oxnard, California, Willard was signed by the Philadelphia Phillies as an amateur free agent in 1979, Willard would make his Major League Baseball debut with the Cleveland Indians on April 11, 1984, and appeared in his final game on May 19, 1994.

Willard's career was spent mostly in obscurity. However, he did experience one significant moment of fame. On October 23, 1991, playing for the Atlanta Braves in the 1991 World Series against the Minnesota Twins, Willard made his only series plate appearance in the bottom of the ninth in a 2–2 game. He was pinch-hitting for Francisco Cabrera after a Minnesota pitching change with Mark Lemke on third Base. Facing top reliever Steve Bedrosian with one out, Willard lofted a high fly out to right fielder Shane Mack that proved to be deep enough to score Lemke with the winning run.

Willard's catching career came to an abrupt end on May 10, 1994 when a foul tip off the bat of Julio Franco struck his right shoulder, causing a fracture and damaged cartilage. He was catching for the Seattle Mariners versus the Chicago White Sox. Unable to complete a throw, he spent the rest of the season between the DL, the minors, and pinch hitting. He was forced to retire at the end of the 1994 season. Today, the piece of padding attached to a catcher's chest protector for extra coverage of his throwing-side's shoulder is called a 'Willard' due to this incident.

See also
 Montreal Expos all-time roster
 Chicago White Sox all-time roster

Sources

External links
, or Retrosheet

1960 births
Living people
Águilas del Zulia players
American expatriate baseball players in Canada
Atlanta Braves players
Baseball players from California
Birmingham Barons players
Calgary Cannons players
Central Oregon Phillies players
Charleston Charlies players
Chicago White Sox players
Cleveland Indians players
Indianapolis Indians players
Maine Guides players
Major League Baseball catchers
Montreal Expos players
Navegantes del Magallanes players
American expatriate baseball players in Venezuela
Oakland Athletics players
Oklahoma City 89ers players
Peninsula Pilots players
Reading Phillies players
Richmond Braves players
Seattle Mariners players
Sportspeople from Oxnard, California
Sportspeople from Ventura County, California
Tacoma Rainiers players
Tacoma Tigers players
Vancouver Canadians players